The Continuum is an album by Ethnic Heritage Ensemble, a jazz band formed by percussionist Kahil El'Zabar, who is joined by trombonist Joseph Bowie and two new members: saxophonist Ernest Dawkins, who replaces Ed Wilkerson, and percussionist 'Atu' Harold Murray. It was recorded in 1997 and released on Delmark.

Reception

In his review for AllMusic, Michael G. Nastos states "All the intensity of the EHE is here, but it has a quieter sonority, allowing more subtle shades to rise to the surface."

The Down Beat review by Jon Andrews notes "Replacing Ed Wilkerson in the ensemble, Dawkins has a tough act to follow, but he succeeds, bringing a lighter, exuberant sound on tenor and alto saxophones."

In a double review for JazzTimes John Murph says "The result is an amazing tribal jazz record that could rival any drum & bass track, hands down. Despite the smoother fluidity, The Continuum also amounts to one of the EHE's funkiest and most accessible offerings of recent times."

Track listing
All compositions by Kahil El'Zabar except as indicated
 "The Continuum" – 11:39
 "Well You Needn't" (Thelonious Monk) – 6:19 
 "Ancestral Song" – 10:02
 "Ornette" – 11:47
 "From Whence We Came" – 8:39
 "Chatham Dirge" – 8:24 
 "All Blues" (Miles Davis) – 7:08

Personnel
Kahil El'Zabar –  drums, percussion, African thumb piano, voice
Joseph Bowie – trombone, percussion
Ernest Dawkins – tenor sax, alto sax, percussion
'Atu' Harold Murray – percussion, voice on 1

References

1997 albums
Kahil El'Zabar albums
Delmark Records albums